Oral P. Tuttle (January 13, 1889–March 9, 1957) was an American lawyer and politician.

Biography
Tuttle was born on a farm near Harrisburg, Illinois. He went to the Harrisburg public schools and received his law degree from Northwestern University Pritzker School of Law. He was admitted to the Illinois bar in 1911 and practiced law in Harrisburg. He served as an Illinois Assistant Attorney Gereral and as deputy circuit court clerk. Tuttle also served as the recorder for Saline County, Illinois. Tuttle served in the United States Navy during World War I.  He served in the Illinois House of Representatives from 1915 to 1919 and in the Illinois Senate from 1935 to 1939. Tuttle was involved with the Republican Party. He served an arbitrator for the Illinois Industrial Commission. Tuttle died in Harrisburg, Illinois after suffering from a long illness.

Notes

External links

1889 births
1957 deaths
People from Harrisburg, Illinois
Military personnel from Illinois
Northwestern University Pritzker School of Law alumni
Illinois lawyers
Republican Party members of the Illinois House of Representatives
Republican Party Illinois state senators
20th-century American politicians
20th-century American lawyers